The 2013 CSU–Pueblo ThunderWolves football team represented Colorado State University–Pueblo in the 2013 NCAA Division II football season. They were led by sixth year head coach John Wristen and played their home games at Neta and Eddie DeRose ThunderBowl. They were a member of the Rocky Mountain Athletic Conference.

Schedule

Source:

Ranking movements

References

CSU–Pueblo
CSU Pueblo ThunderWolves football seasons
Rocky Mountain Athletic Conference football champion seasons
CSU–Pueblo ThunderWolves football